Joseph E. Haines (September 23, 1923 – January 5, 2015) was an American politician.

Haines served in the Ohio House of Representatives from 1981 to 1999 as a Republican. In 1999, Haines resigned from the Ohio General Assembly to take a job in the Ohio Department of Agriculture. 
Born in Xenia, Ohio, Haines received his bachelor's degree in rural economy and farm management from Ohio State University and was a farmer. He died in 2015 in Xenia, Ohio.

References

1923 births
2015 deaths
Politicians from Xenia, Ohio
Ohio State University College of Food, Agricultural, and Environmental Sciences alumni
Farmers from Ohio
Republican Party members of the Ohio House of Representatives